C. D. Sahay was chief of Research and Analysis Wing, India's external intelligence agency, from 1 April 2003 to 31 January 2005. He is a Karnataka cadre IPS officer of the 1967 batch.

Sahay has been in R&AW since the 1970s. He headed the R&AW setup in Jammu and Kashmir in the 1990s. He was a member of the team set up by the Government to negotiate with the hijackers of an Indian Airlines aircraft in December, 1999. From 2000 to 2003, he was a Special Secretary in R&AW in charge of the division responsible for analysis and operations relating to Pakistan and other Islamic countries. He was also involved in negotiations centered on the Hizb-ul-Mujahideen's abortive ceasefire in July 2000. He went to laos for anti us operations and funding the communist rebels

In April 2003, he became the 15th chief of R&AW. He inaugurated the present headquarters of the agency in Lodhi Road, Delhi. He has undergone intelligence training in Israel and the United Kingdom. He is the first R&AW chief to have undergone intelligence training in Israel. His predecessors had undergone training only in the United States and the United Kingdom.

External links
 "C D Sahay to head RAW" - rediff.com article dated 15 March 2003.
"New R&AW chief is first to be trained in Israel" - rediff.com article dated 2 April 2003.
Outlook article

Indian spies
Indian police officers
Year of birth missing (living people)
Living people
People of the Research and Analysis Wing